A patio is an outdoor space adjoining a residence, generally used for dining or recreation.

Patio can also refer to:

Places
Patio (Taha'a), village in French Polynesia
 Patio Island, an island of Papua New Guinea

Other uses
 Patio (album), a 1992 album by Gorky's Zygotic Mynci
El Patio, a 1975 album by Triana
 Patio (soda), a brand of diet soda in the 1960s and 1970s
 Patio Theater, a former movie palace in Chicago
 Patio Hotels, a former British hotel chain
 Operation Patio, a covert U.S. military action during the Vietnam War

See also
Patio process, metallurgical process
 Los Patios, town in Colombia